The Austria women's national field hockey team represents Austria in international women's field hockey. In its only appearance at the Olympic Games, in Moscow in 1980, it finished fifth out of six teams.

Tournament record

Summer Olympics
1980 – 5th place

World Cup
1974 – 8th place
1976 – 9th place
1981 – 12th place

EuroHockey Championship
1984 – 11th place
1987 – 12th place
1991 – 12th place

EuroHockey Championship II
2007 – 8th place
2013 – 5th place
2015 – 7th place
2017 – 7th place
2019 – 4th place
2021 – 7th place

EuroHockey Championship III
2005 – 
2009 – 
2011 –

Hockey World League
2012–13 – 24th place
2014–15 – 28th place
2016–17 – Round 1

FIH Hockey Series
2018–19 – First round

See also
Austria men's national field hockey team

References

External links
Official website
FIH profile

European women's national field hockey teams
Field hockey
National team